Jean Gallois may refer to:

 Jean Gallois (abbot) (1632–1707), French scholar and abbé
 Jean Gallois (musicologist) (1929–2022), pseudonym of Jean Gaillard, French musicologist